Nkululeko Hlophe is a Swazi judge and High Judge of the Court of Swaziland.

References

Swazi judges
Living people
Year of birth missing (living people)
Place of birth missing (living people)